Alamo Heights is an incorporated city that is surrounded by the city of San Antonio in Bexar County in the U.S. state of Texas. At the time of the 2020 census, the population of Alamo Heights was 7,357. It is part of the Greater San Antonio metropolitan area. A portion of the University of the Incarnate Word is in Alamo Heights.

Geography

Alamo Heights is located at  (29.482881, –98.467271). It is bordered by the following neighborhoods: Lincoln Heights to the north, Olmos Park to the west, Brackenridge Park and Fort Sam Houston to the south, and Terrell Hills to the east. All of them are districts within San Antonio except for Terrell Hills and Olmos Park, both independent municipalities similarly to Alamo Heights.

Demographics

As of the 2020 United States census, there were 7,357 people, 3,223 households, and 2,158 families residing in the city.

As of the 2000 U.S. Census, there were 7,319 people, 3,197 households, and 1,819 families residing in this city. The population density was 3,964.9 people per square mile (1,527.5/km2). There were 3,460 housing units at an average density of 1,874.4 per square mile (722.1/km2). The racial makeup of this town was 93.80% White, 0.56% African American, 0.33% Native American, 0.85% Asian, 0.01% Pacific Islander, 2.81% from other races, and 1.64% from two or more races. Hispanic or Latino of any race were 13.55% of the population.

There were 3,197 households, out of which 28.1% had children under the age of 18 living with them, 46.5% were married couples living together, 7.9% had a female householder with no husband present, and 43.1% were non-families. 38.3% of all households were made up of individuals, and 12.9% had someone living alone who was 65 years of age or older. The average household size was 2.16 and the average family size was 2.91.

In the city, the population was spread out, with 22.3% under the age of 18, 6.2% from 18 to 24, 29.2% from 25 to 44, 25.1% from 45 to 64, and 17.2% who were 65 years of age or older. The median age was 40 years. For every 100 females, there were 82.5 males. For every 100 females age 18 and over, there were 75.0 males.

The median income per household in Alamo Heights was $77,257 in 2008 (compared to $64,688 in 2000), while the median per family income was $86,897. Males had a median income of $60,527 versus $37,089 for females. The per capita income for the city was estimated to be $56,335 in 2008. About 1.6% of families and 3.5% of the population were below the poverty line, including 3.7% of those under age 18 and 6.4% of those age 65 or over.

Estimated median house or condo value in 2008 was $341,600 (compared to $202,200 in 2000).

Mean prices in 2008: All housing units: $440,427. Detached houses: $437,838. Townhouses or other attached units: $373,366. In 2-unit ("duplex") structures: $200,395. In 3-to-4-unit ("triplex" to "fourplex") structures: $294,787. In 5-or-more-unit structures: $491,936.

Federal government offices
The United States Postal Service operates the Alamo Heights Post Office.

Education

Primary and secondary schools 

Alamo Heights is served by the Alamo Heights Independent School District, which has its headquarters in the city limits.

Howard Early Childhood Center in San Antonio serves early childhood residents. Most residents are zoned to Cambridge Elementary School in Alamo Heights, while some are zoned to Woodridge Elementary School in San Antonio. All residents are zoned to Alamo Heights Junior School in San Antonio and Alamo Heights High School which is situated in Alamo Heights at 6900 Broadway.

Private schools within the town limits are St. Peter Prince of the Apostles Catholic School (K–8) and St. Luke's Episcopal School (Pre-K–8). Nearby private schools outside the town limits include The San Antonio Academy in Monte Vista (Pre-K–8), Keystone School in Monte Vista (Pre-K–12), St. Mary's Hall (San Antonio, Texas) (K–12), Incarnate Word High School in San Antonio (9–12), St. Anthony Catholic School in Monte Vista (Pre-K3–8), St. Anthony Catholic High School (9–12) in Monte Vista, and St. Pius X in San Antonio (K–8).

Colleges and universities 
The University of the Incarnate Word is partially within Alamo Heights.

Public libraries 

There are no public libraries in Alamo Heights. The Landa Memorial Library of the San Antonio Public Library, located in the Monte Vista Historic District in San Antonio, is the most proximal.

History
The City of Alamo Heights was incorporated in 1922. Eventual growth to the north would happen later with the annexation of Bluebonnet Hills and Sylvan Hills in 1928 and 1944, respectively.

Attractions 
The Alamo Quarry Market shopping center, Quarry Village, Lincoln Heights Shopping Center, H-E-B's Central Market, North Star Mall, McNay Art Museum, and the headquarters for Clear Channel Communications can be found outside Alamo Heights.

References

External links

 City of Alamo Heights official website
 Alamo Heights in the Handbook of Texas Online at the University of Texas, Austin

Cities in Texas
Cities in Bexar County, Texas
Greater San Antonio